The Warme Bode is the right-hand headstream of the Bode in the High Harz mountains of central Germany in the states of Lower Saxony and Saxony-Anhalt.

Name
The names of the Warme and Kalte Bode ('Warm' and 'Cold' Bode) come from their actual temperature difference of about 2 °C.

Headstreams

Große Bode
Its source is at the foot of the highest mountain in the Harz, the Brocken, in the southern part of the so-called Brockenfeld on the border of Saxony-Anhalt. Immediately nearby are the sources of the Kalte Bode, the Ecker and the Oder. The Große Bode flows mainly southwards, on the western slopes of the Wurmberg towards  Braunlage. Its course is characterised by little waterfalls and steps (Fallstufen) including the Oberer Bodefall. In front of Braunlage it is united with the Kleine Bode ('Little Bode') to form the Warme Bode.

Kleine Bode
It rises at the foot of the Achtermannshöhe.

Course
After the confluence of its headstreams, the Warme Bode flows over the waterfall of the Unterer Bodefall towards Braunlage. There it is joined by the Ulrichswasser. It continues in the direction of Sorge. From the state border with Saxony-Anhalt it runs parallel to the B 242 federal road to Tanne.

Next the Warme Bode runs through a delightful valley and is united with the Kalte Bode near Königshütte, below the ruins of Königsburg to form the Bode.

Tributaries

See also
 List of rivers of Lower Saxony
 List of rivers of Saxony-Anhalt

External links
 The Warme Bode in the Harz 
 The Bode Gorge 

Rivers of Lower Saxony
Rivers of Saxony-Anhalt
Rivers of the Harz
Rivers of Germany